Lăzești may refer to the following places in Romania:

 Lăzești, a village in Scărișoara Commune, Alba County 
 Lăzești, a village in Vadu Moților Commune, Alba County
 Lăzești (river), a tributary of the Neagra in Alba County